Oxyopes aglossus is a species of lynx spider in the family Oxyopidae. It is found in the United States.

References

External links

 

Oxyopidae
Articles created by Qbugbot
Spiders described in 1929